Robert Eric Hegel (born on August 5, 1948) is an American singer-songwriter best known for writing the Air Supply top twenty hit "Just as I Am" (with guitarist Dick Wagner) and the top ten disco hit "Sinner Man" for Sarah Dash (of Labelle).

Early life
Born in Dayton, Ohio, Hegel attended Centerville High School and was in the garage band The Chandells that changed its name to Bittervetch with the release of the 7" single "Bigger Fool", in 1966.

Hegel enrolled at the University of Cincinnati College Conservatory of Music and continued to write and perform in various clubs around campus.

Music career
In 1973, RCA signed Hegel to a recording contract and released the singles "New York City Girl" and "Hello Jekyll, Goodbye Mister Hyde".

Hegel signed a publishing deal with Don Kirshner and Hegel, along with his lyricist Amanda George, wrote songs for various television projects such as NBC's The Kids from C.A.P.E.R., the CBS sitcom A Year at the Top (co-produced with Norman Lear), theme songs for the pilot episodes of Say Uncle and Stick Around (starring Andy Kaufman), and the theme for Don Kirshner's Rock Concert.

In 1980, RCA released the Hegel LP.  The first single from the album, "Tommy, Judy & Me", received radio airplay on the East Coast, including New York City. The opening lyric, "Tommy said that he's had some girls in the strangest positions in the back of his car", was deemed too controversial for many stations to add it to their playlists.  The popularity of the song on the stations that did play it caught the attention of Dick Clark, and Hegel was invited to appear on American Bandstand. Upon arriving in Hollywood, Hegel was informed that the network censors would not clear "Tommy, Judy & Me" and the producer asked for two other songs to be performed instead.

Choreographer Patricia Birch, who had just been given the director's chair for the film Grease 2, noticed "Tommy, Judy & Me" and asked Hegel to submit some songs.  After receiving the script, Hegel wrote "Do It for Our Country" for the bomb shelter scene and played it over the phone to Birch.

In 1982, Hegel was introduced to guitarist and songwriter Dick Wagner and they decided to write some songs for Hegel to record and Wagner to produce.  The first song written and recorded was "Just as I Am". Record promoter Chuck Dembrak took the recording to Chip Taylor at Polydor/Mercury Records and Hegel was signed to a recording contract. In 1983, on the day Chip Taylor and the entire promotion department were fired, "Just as I Am" was released.

Hegel later received a call from a former associate at RCA, Dave Carpin, who was now at Arista, and suggested "Just as I Am" would be the perfect follow-up to Air Supply's hit song "Making Love Out of Nothing at All" and was to give it to Clive Davis for evaluation. In 1985, Arista released Air Supply's version of the song and it became a top twenty U.S. hit.

Also in 1985, Chuck Dembrak approached Hegel with an idea to do a dance instrumental version of the Iron Butterfly song, "In-A-Gadda-Da-Vida" for Kama Sutra Records.  Dembrak brought in guitarist Les Fradkin and with Hegel producing and playing the synthesizer parts with Fradkin, their version was recorded.  Needing a B-side, Hegel enlisted his friend Dick Wagner, and together they recorded an instrumental version of Hegel's "Frustrated", released in 1985.

Hegel released Hegel 2 – Displays (a 20-song CD compilation) on Red Lips Records in 2009.  The CD features original first recordings of his songs "Tommy, Judy & Me", "We’re Lovers After All", and "You Wonder". A download-only collection titled Road Signs was released in 2012 and features some of Hegel's current work. In 2014, Hegel was asked to contribute songs to the Pete Quaife Foundation CD, Legends – Shoulder to Shoulder.  Hegel contributed "You & I" from his Road Signs CD and recorded a mostly a cappella version of the Kinks hit song, "Tired of Waiting for You". The CD set was released in 2014.

In addition to songwriting and recording, Hegel has been recognized for his vocal harmonies and background vocal arranging skills.  For Don Kirshner, Hegel arranged and sang background vocals (with Jay Siegel of The Tokens) for The Kids from C.A.P.E.R. project, and two albums by Sarah Dash; her eponymous debut album that featured "Sinner Man" and the follow-up Oo-La-La. During this time, Hegel was also hired to write, arrange, and perform the theme songs for two television pilots: Say Uncle (starring Richard B. Shull) and Stick Around (starring Andy Kaufman).  Producer Steve Katz called Hegel into the studio to sing multi-overdub background vocals for the "Sad Song" track on Lou Reed Live, and for Harper Hug at Thunder Underground Recording Studio. Hegel arranged and performed all background vocals on Jamie Palumbo's Realistic CD and sang the background vocals on John Stanley King Band's "Dem Boulettes".

Novel
In his first novel, Tuxedo Bob, co-authored with his wife Susan, Hegel combines his songwriting abilities with his quick wit and love for the English language to weave a tale of whimsy and wonder about a uniquely talented, impeccably dressed, and compulsively honest man.

In addition to Tuxedo Bob and Hegel's extensive music catalogue, he has written a musical thriller, The Mirror of Mister Moore, an action/detective screenplay, All That Glitter, and a stage play, And Then… What?.

Discography

Albums
 1980 – Hegel, RCA Records 
 2005 – Masters & Demos – Chapter 1, Gear Fab Records
 2009 – Hegel 2 - Displays, Red Lips Records
 2012 – Road Signs, Red Lips Records
 2015 – Make It Magical, Red Lips Records
 2019 - Tommy, Judy and Me + 23 for the record, Red Lips Records

Recordings
 1966 – "Bigger Fool" b/w "A Girl Like You", Pixie Records
 1967 – "I Don’t Care", Hinda Records
 1973 – "New York City Girl" b/w Clock in the Tower", RCA Records
 1974 – "Hello Jekyll, Goodbye Mister Hyde", RCA Records
 1980 – "Tommy, Judy and Me", RCA Records
 1980 – "We’re Lovers After All", RCA Records
 1982 – "Just as I Am", Mercury Records
 1985 – "In a Gadda Da Vida", Kama Sutra Records
 2009 – "It's Almost Christmas", Red Lips Records

References

1948 births
Living people
American male pop singers
American male songwriters
Musicians from Dayton, Ohio
University of Cincinnati – College-Conservatory of Music alumni